The Battle of Konotop was a military engagement that took place around the city of Konotop, Ukraine between the military forces of Russia and Ukraine as part of the Northeastern Ukraine offensive during the 2022 Russian invasion of Ukraine.

Battle
On 24 February, a mixed Russian column of up to 300 vehicles approached Konotop, before engaging Ukrainian mechanized units.

On 25 February, burned Russian equipment was seen in Konotop and its outskirts, while the city was besieged by the Russian army. The Ukrainian Army stated that Russian forces besieging the city were poorly supplied. However, Ukrainian forces lost control of the city later that day.

Aftermath 

On 2 March, Artem Seminikhin, the mayor of Konotop, stated that Russian forces in the city warned him that they would shell the city if the residents resisted them. Russian vehicles, deployed outside the City Council, were surrounded by locals. Seminikhin asked the residents of the city whether they wanted to fight or surrender, whereupon the residents "overwhelmingly" refused to surrender.

Later in the day, city authorities began negotiations with Russian forces, with talks lasting 12 minutes. An agreement was reached under which Russian forces accepted not to change the city's government, deploy troops in the city, obstruct transportation, or remove the Ukrainian flag. In return, the city officials agreed that the residents would not attack Russian forces.

On 3 April, Ukrainian MP Olexander Kachura stated on Twitter that all Russian forces had left Konotop Raion. On 4 April 2022 Sumy Oblast's Governor Dmytro Zhyvytskyi stated that Russian troops no longer occupied any towns or villages in Sumy Oblast and had mostly withdrawn, while Ukrainian troops were working to push out the remaining units.

References 

Konotop
February 2022 events in Ukraine
Konotop
March 2022 events in Ukraine
Northeastern Ukraine campaign